The Warburton Highway is a 34 kilometre west–east semi-rural highway starting on the eastern fringes of Melbourne, Victoria (Australia) at the Maroondah Highway just after Lilydale, connecting Melbourne to the Yarra Valley wine region and its towns, as well as Melbourne's closest mountain peak to receive regular snowfall, Mount Donna Buang. The entire road falls within the Shire of Yarra Ranges local government area and is wholly managed by VicRoads. It is a single carriageway for its entire length, being completely sealed since 1941, with one lane in each direction and occasional overtaking lanes being provided. Speed limits range from 50 to 60 km/h through townships and 70–80 km/h elsewhere. Because of the lack of the standard 100 km/h rural speed limit and high traffic volumes, Victoria Police maintain a high level of patrol and vigilance.

The highway continues east of Warburton as Woods Point Road (C511)

With the introduction of traffic lights in Seville, as well as the reduction of speed limits and addition of a greater number of speed zones, the Warburton Highway is becoming over congested during peak times. Evidence of this can be seen during any weekday afternoon. Outbound traffic approaching a pedestrian crossing in Seville often queues up to 1.1 km.

Motor vehicle accidents are predominant in and around the Alsopps Road intersection in Launching Place due to fuel residue from a nearby petrol station. As many as 7 incidents in the last 6 months have had locals approaching their local MP to voice their concern.

History
The passing of the Highways and Vehicles Act of 1924 through the Parliament of Victoria provided for the declaration of State Highways, roads two-thirds financed by the State government through the Country Roads Board (later VicRoads). The Warburton Highway was declared a State Highway in the 1959–60 financial year, from Lilydale via Seville, Woori Yallock and Yarra Junction to Warburton (for a total of 21 miles); before this declaration, this road was referred to as (Main) Warburton Road.

The Warburton Highway was signed as State Route 174 between Lilydale and Warburton in 1986; with Victoria's conversion to the newer alphanumeric system in the late 1990s, this was replaced by route B380.

Major intersections and towns
The entire highway is in the Shire of Yarra Ranges local government area.

See also

 Highways in Australia
 Highways in Victoria

References

External links
 Visit Warburton  (Warburton Valley Community Economic Development Association)
 Warburton Highway (Yarra Valley Tourism Association)
 Warburton Info (Warburton Visitor Information)
 Warburton Highway (dedicated website) (Information about townships from Lilydale to East Warburton)

Highways in Australia
Highways and freeways in Melbourne
Yarra Valley